Future Soldier is a reform of the British Army resulting from the Integrated Review of Security, Defence, Development and Foreign Policy ("Global Britain in a Competitive Age") published in March 2021. The aim of the reform is to create a more lethal, agile and expeditionary force, able to fight and win wars and to operate in the grey-zone between peace and war.  Future Soldier was published on 25 November 2021 and deals with the organizational changes of the British Army, with changes to personnel and equipment were set out in the Defence in a Competitive Age paper published on 22 March 2021.

The British Army will be reduced to 73,000 regular personnel by 2025. The reserves will be kept at the current level.

Allied Rapid Reaction Corps 
The Allied Rapid Reaction Corps (ARRC) is a high readiness corps-level command tasked to lead NATO’s Response Force (NRF).
 Allied Rapid Reaction Corps (ARRC), in Innsworth

1st Signal Brigade 
1st Signal Brigade provides communications elements to Allied Rapid Reaction Corps (ARRC), Permanent Joint Headquarters (PJHQ), Joint Helicopter Command (JHC), Joint Task Force HQ (JTFHQ), and other government departments.
 1st Signal Brigade, in Innsworth
 10 Signal Regiment, Royal Corps of Signals, in Corsham (Communication and Information Support)
 16 Signal Regiment, Royal Corps of Signals, in Stafford (Sustainment Signals Support Regiment)
 22 Signal Regiment, Royal Corps of Signals, in Stafford (HQ ARRC Signal Regiment)
 30 Signal Regiment, Royal Corps of Signals, in Gamecock (JHC/JTFHQ Signals Regiment)
 32 Signal Regiment, Royal Corps of Signals, in Glasgow (Signal Regiment - Reserve)
 39 Signal Regiment, Royal Corps of Signals, in Bristol (Signal Regiment - Reserve)
 Gurkha ARRC Support Battalion, in Innsworth (Logistics and Force Protection for HQ ARRC)
 299 Signal Squadron, Royal Corps of Signals, in Bletchley (Special Communications)

104 Theatre Sustainment Brigade 
104 Theatre Sustainment Brigade is a theatre logistic enabling formation that operates strategic and operational Lines of Communications.
 104 Theatre Sustainment Brigade, in South Cerney
 9 Supply Regiment, Royal Logistic Corps, in Hullavington (Theatre Support Regiment)
 17 Port and Maritime Regiment, Royal Logistic Corps, in Marchwood (Port and Maritime Regiment)
 29 Postal Courier and Movement Regiment, Royal Logistic Corps, in South Cerney (Movement Control Regiment)
 9 Theatre Support Battalion, Royal Electrical and Mechanical Engineers, in Aldershot (Equipment Support; unit to be established by 2025)
 2 Operational Support Group, Royal Logistic Corps, in Grantham (Logistics Operational Support Group; moves to Cottesmore in 2025)
 152 Logistic Regiment, Royal Logistic Corps, in Belfast (Fuel Support Regiment - Reserve)
 162 Logistic Regiment, Royal Logistic Corps, in Nottingham (Movement Control and Communications Regiment - Reserve)
 165 Port and Maritime Regiment, Royal Logistic Corps, in Plymouth (Port and Maritime Regiment - Reserve)
 167 Regiment, Royal Logistic Corps, in Grantham (Catering Support Regiment - Reserve; moves to Cottesmore by 2027)

Field Army 
 Field Army, in Andover
 1st (UK) Division, in York
 3rd (UK) Division, in Bulford
 6th (UK) Division, in Upavon
 Field Army Troops, in Andover

1st (UK) Division 

1st (UK) Division is the British Army's main contributor for land operations outside the Euro-Atlantic area and operations on NATO's flanks.
 1st (UK) Division, in York (Moves to Catterick by 2028)

4th Light Brigade Combat Team 
4th Light Brigade Combat Team consists of light infantry formations.
 4th Light Brigade Combat Team, in Catterick
 Light Dragoons, in Catterick (Light Cavalry)
 1st Battalion, Coldstream Guards, in Windsor (Light Infantry)
 1st Battalion, Grenadier Guards, in Aldershot (Light Infantry)
 1st Battalion, Duke of Lancaster's Regiment, in Chester (Light Infantry; moves to Cyprus in 2022 and then Blackpool in 2024)
 1st Battalion, Royal Gurkha Rifles, in Folkestone (Light Infantry; moves to Brunei in 2022)
 2nd Battalion, Royal Regiment of Scotland, in Edinburgh (Light Infantry)
 2nd Battalion, The Rifles, in Lisburn (Light Infantry)
 103 Regiment, Royal Artillery, in St Helens (Close Support Light Artillery - Reserve)
 75 Engineer Regiment, Royal Engineers, in Warrington (Close Support Engineers - Reserve)
 154 (Scottish) Logistic Regiment, Royal Logistic Corps, in Dunfermline (Transport Regiment - Reserve)
 102 Battalion, Royal Electrical and Mechanical Engineers, in Newton Aycliffe (Close Support - Reserve)

7th Light Mechanised Brigade Combat Team 
7th Light Mechanised Brigade Combat Team is a high readiness and highly mobile formation.
 7th Light Mechanised Brigade Combat Team, in Cottesmore
 Royal Scots Dragoon Guards, in Leuchars (Light Cavalry)
 1st Battalion, Scots Guards, in Catterick (Light Mechanised Infantry)
 1st Battalion, Yorkshire Regiment, in Catterick (Light Mechanised Infantry)
 1st Battalion, The Rifles, in Beachley (Light Mechanised Infantry; moves to Cyprus in 2023 and then Chepstow in 2025)
 2nd Battalion, Royal Anglian Regiment, in Cottesmore (Light Mechanised Infantry)
 4th Battalion, Royal Regiment of Scotland, in Catterick (Light Mechanised Infantry)
 4th Regiment, Royal Artillery, in Topcliffe (Close Support Light Artillery; will gain an additional group by May 2023)
 105 Regiment, Royal Artillery, in Edinburgh (Close Support Light Artillery - Reserve)
 32 Engineer Regiment, Royal Engineers, in Catterick (Close Support Engineers)
 6 Regiment, Royal Logistic Corps, in Dishforth (Close Support Logistics)
 3 Medical Regiment, Royal Army Medical Corps, in Catterick (Close Support Medical Regiment; redesignation from 5 Medical Regiment in 2023)
 1 Battalion, Royal Electrical and Mechanical Engineers, in Catterick (Close Support)

11th Security Force Assistance Brigade 
11th Security Force Assistance Brigade trains and mentors allied and partner nations' ground units.
 11th Security Force Assistance Brigade, in Aldershot
 1st Battalion, Irish Guards, in Aldershot (Security Force Assistance)
 1st Battalion, Royal Anglian Regiment, in Cyprus (Security Force Assistance; moves to Cottesmore in 2023)
 3rd Battalion, The Rifles, in Edinburgh (Security Force Assistance; moves to Blackpool by 2027)
 3rd Battalion (Black Watch), Royal Regiment of Scotland, in Inverness (Security Force Assistance)
 4th Battalion, Princess of Wales's Royal Regiment, in Redhill (Light Infantry - Reserve)
 Outreach Group, in Hermitage (Outreach and Cultural Support; moves to Pirbright in 2027)

19th Brigade 
19th Brigade is to be reactivated in 2022 to command and generate Army Reserve combat units.
 19th Brigade, in York (Will be reactivated in 2022)
 Scottish and North Irish Yeomanry, in Edinburgh (Light Cavalry - Reserve)
 Queen's Own Yeomanry, in Newcastle upon Tyne (Light Cavalry - Reserve)
 2nd Battalion, Royal Irish Regiment, in Lisburn (Infantry - Reserve; will gain an additional company by May 2023)
 3rd Battalion, Royal Anglian Regiment, in Bury St Edmunds (Infantry - Reserve)
 4th Battalion, Yorkshire Regiment, in York (Infantry - Reserve)
 4th Battalion, Duke of Lancaster's Regiment, in Preston (Infantry - Reserve)
 6th Battalion, The Rifles, in Exeter (Infantry - Reserve)
 6th Battalion, Royal Regiment of Scotland, in Glasgow (Infantry - Reserve)
 7th Battalion, Royal Regiment of Scotland, in Perth (Infantry - Reserve)
 8th Battalion, The Rifles, in Bishop Auckland (Infantry - Reserve)

8 Engineer Brigade 
8 Engineer Brigade commands the army's two engineer specialist groups: 12 Group provides land and air force support engineering. 29 Group provides Explosive Ordnance Disposal, and Counter-Chemical Biological Radiological and Nuclear capabilities.
 8 Engineer Brigade, in Minley (restructure by 2023)
 12 Force Support Group, at RAF Wittering
 36 Regiment, Royal Engineers, in Maidstone (Force Support Engineers; moves to Cottesmore by 2028)
 39 Regiment, Royal Engineers, in Kinloss Barracks (Force Support (Air) Engineers)
 71 Engineer Regiment, Royal Engineers, in Leuchars (Force Support Engineers - Reserve)
 20 Works Group, Royal Engineers, at RAF Wittering (Specialist Air Infrastructure Support)
 62 Works Group, Royal Engineers, in Chilwell (Infrastructure Support; moves to Stafford in 2026)
 63 Works Group, Royal Engineers, in Chilwell (Infrastructure Support; moves to Stafford in 2026)
 65 Works Group, Royal Engineers, in Chilwell (Infrastructure Support - Reserve; moves to Stafford in 2026)
 66 Works Group, Royal Engineers, in Chilwell (Infrastructure Support; moves to Stafford in 2026)
 29 EOD & Search Group, in Aldershot
 11 EOD Regiment, Royal Logistic Corps, in Didcot (EOD and Search Regiment)
 28 Regiment, Royal Engineers, in Woodbridge (Counter CBRN)
 33 Regiment, Royal Engineers, in Wimbish (Explosive ordnance disposal and Search Regiment)
 35 Regiment, Royal Engineers, in Wimbish (EOD and Search Regiment)
 101 Regiment, Royal Engineers, in Catford  (EOD and Search Regiment - Reserve)
 1st Military Working Dog Regiment, in North Luffenham (Military working dogs; moves to Cottesmore in 2023)

102 Operational Sustainment Brigade 
102 Operational Sustainment Brigade moves troops and equipment to the battle area and logistically sustains fighting formations.
 102 Operational Sustainment Brigade, in Grantham (Will move to York in 2024)
 7 Regiment, Royal Logistic Corps, in Cottesmore (Force Logistic Regiment; will move to Abingdon in 2023)
 150 Regiment, Royal Logistic Corps, in Kingston upon Hull (Transport Regiment - Reserve)
 158 Regiment, Royal Logistic Corps, in Peterborough (Aviation Support Regiment - Reserve)
 159 Regiment, Royal Logistic Corps, in Coventry (Supply & Transport Regiment - Reserve)
 2 Battalion, Royal Electrical and Mechanical Engineers, in Leuchars (Force Support)
 101 Battalion, Royal Electrical and Mechanical Engineers, in Keynsham (Force Support - Reserve)

1st Divisional Integrated Effects Group 
 1st Divisional Integrated Effects Group, in Catterick
 1 Military Intelligence Battalion, Intelligence Corps, in Catterick (Military Intelligence)
 5 Military Intelligence Battalion, Intelligence Corps, in Edinburgh (Military Intelligence - Reserve)
 2 Signal Regiment, Royal Corps of Signals, in York (Communication and Information Support; will move to Catterick by 2028)
 37 Signal Regiment, Royal Corps of Signals, in Redditch (Signal Regiment - Reserve)

3rd (UK) Division 

 3rd (UK) Division, in Bulford

12th Armoured Brigade Combat Team 
 12th Armoured Brigade Combat Team, in Bulford
 King's Royal Hussars, in Tidworth (Armoured Cavalry)
 Royal Tank Regiment, in Tidworth (Armoured)
 Royal Wessex Yeomanry, in Bovington (Armoured - Reserve)
 1st Battalion, Mercian Regiment, in Bulford (Mechanised Infantry)
 4th Battalion, Mercian Regiment, in Wolverhampton (Infantry - Reserve)
 1st Battalion, Royal Welsh, in Tidworth (Mechanised Infantry)
 3rd Battalion, Royal Welsh, in Cardiff (Infantry - Reserve)
 4 Regiment, Royal Logistic Corps, in Abingdon (Close Support Logistics; will move to Catterick in 2028)
 4 Battalion, Royal Electrical and Mechanical Engineers, in Tidworth (Armoured Close Support)
 2 Medical Regiment, Royal Army Medical Corps, in Tidworth (Close Support Medical Regiment; redesignation from 4 Medical Regiment by May 2023)

20th Armoured Brigade Combat Team 
 20th Armoured Brigade Combat Team, in Bulford
 Royal Dragoon Guards, in Warminster (Armoured Cavalry)
 Queen's Royal Hussars, in Tidworth (Armoured)
 1st Battalion, Royal Regiment of Fusiliers, in Tidworth (Mechanised Infantry)
 5th Battalion, Royal Regiment of Fusiliers, in Alnwick (Infantry - Reserve)
 5th Battalion, The Rifles, in Bulford (Mechanised Infantry)
 7th Battalion, The Rifles, in Kensington (Infantry - Reserve)
 1st Battalion, Princess of Wales's Royal Regiment, in Cyprus (Mechanised Infantry; will move to Tidworth or Bulford in 2024)
 3rd Battalion, Princess of Wales's Royal Regiment, in Canterbury (Infantry - Reserve)
 1 Regiment, Royal Logistic Corps, in Bicester (Close Support Logistics)
 3 Battalion, Royal Electrical and Mechanical Engineers, in Tidworth (Armoured Close Support)
 1 Medical Regiment, Royal Army Medical Corps, in Tidworth (Close Support Medical Regiment)

1st Deep Recce Strike Brigade Combat Team 
 1st Deep Recce Strike Brigade Combat Team, in Tidworth
 Household Cavalry Regiment, in Bulford (Armoured Cavalry)
 Royal Lancers, in Catterick (Armoured Cavalry; will move to Tidworth in 2026)
 1st Queen's Dragoon Guards, in Swanton Morley (Light Cavalry; will move to Caerwent by 2027)
 Royal Yeomanry, in Leicester (Light Cavalry - Reserve)
 1st Regiment, Royal Horse Artillery, in Larkhill (Armoured Close Support Artillery)
 3rd Regiment, Royal Horse Artillery, in Newcastle upon Tyne (Deep Fires)
 5th Regiment, Royal Artillery, in Catterick (Surveillance and Target Acquisition)
 19 Regiment, Royal Artillery, in Larkhill (Armoured Close Support Artillery)
 26 Regiment, Royal Artillery, in Larkhill (Deep Fires)
 101 Regiment, Royal Artillery, in Gateshead (Deep Fires - Reserve)
 104 Regiment, Royal Artillery, in Newport (Close Support Artillery - Reserve)
 6 Armoured Close Support Battalion, Royal Electrical and Mechanical Engineers, in Tidworth (Close Support)

7 Air Defence Group 
 7 Air Defence Group, in Thorney Island
 12 Regiment, Royal Artillery, in Thorney Island (Short Range Air Defence)
 16 Regiment, Royal Artillery, in Thorney Island (Medium Range Air Defence)
 106 Regiment, Royal Artillery, in London (Air Defence - Reserve)

25 (Close Support) Engineer Group 
 25 (Close Support) Engineer Group, in Bulford
 21 Engineer Regiment, Royal Engineers, in Ripon (Force Support Engineers; will move to Catterick in 2025)
 22 Engineer Regiment, Royal Engineers, in Perham Down (Close Support Engineers)
 26 Engineer Regiment, Royal Engineers, in Perham Down (Close Support Engineers)
 Royal Monmouthshire Royal Engineers, in Monmouth (Engineers - Reserve)

101 Operational Sustainment Brigade 
 101 Operational Sustainment Brigade, in Aldershot
 10 Queen's Own Gurkha Logistic Regiment, in Aldershot (Divisional Support Logistics)
 27 Regiment, Royal Logistic Corps, in Aldershot (Divisional Support Logistics; will gain an additional squadron by June 2023)
 151 Regiment, Royal Logistic Corps, in Croydon (Transport Regiment - Reserve)
 156 Regiment, Royal Logistic Corps, in Liverpool (Supply Regiment - Reserve)
 157 (Welsh) Regiment, Royal Logistic Corps, in Cardiff (Transport Regiment - Reserve)
 5 Battalion, Royal Electrical and Mechanical Engineers, in Lyneham (Force Support)
 103 Battalion, Royal Electrical and Mechanical Engineers, in Northampton (Force Support - Reserve)

7 Signals Group 
 7 Signals Group, in Bulford
 1 Signal Regiment, Royal Corps of Signals, in Perham Down (Communication and Information Support)
 3 Signal Regiment, Royal Corps of Signals, in Bulford (Communication and Information Support)
 15 Signal Regiment, Royal Corps of Signals, in Perham Down (Communication and Information Support)
 71 Signal Regiment, Royal Corps of Signals, in Bexley Heath (Signal Regiment - Reserve)

3rd UK Divisional Integrated Effects Group 
 3rd UK Divisional Integrated Effects Group, in Bulford
 4 Military Intelligence Battalion, Intelligence Corps, in Bulford (Military Intelligence)
 7 Military Intelligence Battalion, Intelligence Corps, in Bristol (Military Intelligence - Reserve)

6th (UK) Division 
 6th (UK) Division, in Upavon

Army Special Operations Brigade 
 Army Special Operations Brigade, in Aldershot
 1st Battalion, Ranger Regiment, in Belfast (Army Rangers; former 1st Battalion, Royal Regiment of Scotland)
 2nd Battalion, Ranger Regiment, in Aldershot (Army Rangers; former 2nd Battalion, Princess of Wales's Royal Regiment)
 3rd Battalion, Ranger Regiment, in Pirbright (Army Rangers; former 2nd Battalion, Duke of Lancaster's Regiment; will move to Aldershot in 2027)
 4th Battalion, Ranger Regiment, in Aldershot (Army Rangers; former 4th Battalion, The Rifles)
 255 Signal Squadron, Royal Corps of Signals, in Perham Down (Communication and Information Support; will move to Aldershot in 2027)

77th Brigade 
 77th Brigade, in Hermitage (Will move to Pirbright in 2026)
 Staff Corps, in Hermitage (Capacity Building; will move to Pirbright in 2026)
 Deployed Information Activities, in Hermitage (Deployed Information Activity; will move to Pirbright in 2026)
 Stand-off Information Activities, in Hermitage (Stand-off Information Activity; will move to Pirbright in 2026)
 6 Military Intelligence Battalion, Intelligence Corps, in Manchester (Military Intelligence, hybrid active/reserve unit; will move to Pirbright by 2026)
 The Honourable Artillery Company, in London (Surveillance and Target Acquisition - Reserve)

Field Army Troops 

 Field Army Troops, in Andover

16 Air Assault Brigade Combat Team 
 16 Air Assault Brigade Combat Team, in Colchester
 2nd Battalion, Parachute Regiment, in Colchester (Airborne Infantry)
 3rd Battalion, Parachute Regiment, in Colchester (Airborne Infantry)
 4th Battalion, Parachute Regiment, in Leeds (Airborne Infantry - Reserve)
 2nd Battalion, Royal Gurkha Rifles, in Brunei (Air Assault Infantry; will move to Folkestone in 2022)
 1st Battalion, Royal Irish Regiment, in Ternhill (Light Recce Strike Infantry; will move to Edinburgh by 2027)
 7th Parachute Regiment, Royal Horse Artillery, in Colchester (Airborne Close Support Artillery; will gain an additional group by May 2023)
 23 Parachute Engineer Regiment, Royal Engineers, in Woodbridge (Close Support Air Manoeuvre Engineers)
 13 Air Assault Regiment, Royal Logistic Corps, in Colchester (Air Assault Logistics; will gain an additional squadron by December 2022)
 16 Medical Regiment, Royal Army Medical Corps, in Colchester (Air Manoeuvre Medical Regiment)
 216 Signal Squadron, Royal Corps of Signals, in Colchester (Communication and Information Support)
 Pathfinders, in Colchester

Intelligence, Surveillance and Reconnaissance Group 
 Intelligence, Surveillance and Reconnaissance Group, in Upavon
 32 Regiment, Royal Artillery, in Larkhill (Miniature Un-crewed Aerial Systems)
 47 Regiment, Royal Artillery, in Larkhill (Tactical Un-crewed Aerial Systems: Watchkeeper WK450)
 2 Military Intelligence Battalion, Intelligence Corps, in Upavon (Intelligence Exploitation, hybrid active/reserve unit)
 3 Military Intelligence Battalion, Intelligence Corps, in London (Military Intelligence - Reserve)
 Specialist Group Military Intelligence, in Hermitage (Military Intelligence - Reserve; will move to Aldershot by 2026)
 Land Intelligence Fusion Centre, in Hermitage (Will move to Andover in 2027)

2nd Medical Group 
 2nd Medical Group, in Strensall
 21 Multi-Role Medical Regiment, in Strensall (Restructured 34 Field Hospital)
 22 Multi-Role Medical Regiment, in Aldershot (Restructured 22 Field Hospital; will move to Preston in 2023 and then to Strensall by 2026)
 202 (Midlands) Multi-Role Medical Regiment, in Birmingham (Reserve; restructured 202 Field Hospital)
 203 (Welsh) Multi-Role Medical Regiment, in Cardiff (Reserve; restructured 203 Field Hospital)
 206 (North-West) Multi-Role Medical Regiment, in Manchester and Liverpool (Reserve; merged and restructured 207 and 208 field hospitals)
 210 (North Irish) Multi-Role Medical Regiment, in Belfast (Reserve; merged and restructured 204 Field Hospital and 253 Medical Regiment)
 214 (North-East) Multi-Role Medical Regiment, in Newcastle upon Tyne and Sheffield (Reserve; merged and restructured 201 and 212 field hospitals)
 215 (Scottish) Multi-Role Medical Regiment, in Glasgow (Reserve; merged and restructured 205 Field Hospital and 225 Medical Regiment)
 243 (Wessex) Multi-Role Medical Regiment, in Keynsham (Reserve; restructured 243 Field Hospital)
 254 (East of England) Multi-Role Medical Regiment, in Cambridge (Reserve; restructured 254 Medical Regiment)
 256 (London and South-East) Multi-Role Medical Regiment, in Walworth (Reserve; restructured 256 Field Hospital)
 306 Hospital Support Regiment, in Strensall (Hospital Support Regiment - Reserve)
 335 Medical Evacuation Regiment, in Strensall (Medical Evacuation - Reserve)
 Medical Operations Support Unit, in Strensall (Medical Operations Support Unit - Reserve)

Cyber and Electro Magnetic Activities Effects Group 
 Cyber and Electro Magnetic Activities Effects Group, in Andover
 13 Signal Regiment, Royal Corps of Signals, in Blandford (Cyber; will move to Corsham by 2028)
 14 Signal Regiment, Royal Corps of Signals, in Brawdy (Electronic Warfare; will move to Innsworth by 2028)
 21 Signal Regiment, Royal Corps of Signals, in Colerne (Electronic Warfare; will move to Innsworth by 2028)

Land Warfare Centre 
 Land Warfare Centre, in Warminster
 Collective Training Group
 British Army Training Unit Suffield (BATUS), in Suffield (Canada)
 British Army Training Unit Kenya (BATUK), in Nanyuki (Kenya)
 British Army Training and Support Unit Belize (BATSUB), in Ladyville (Belize)
 Command, Staff and Tactical Training Group (CSTTG)
 Mission Ready Training Centre (MRTC), in Royston
 Combat Ready Training Centre
 Army Schools
 1 Royal School of Military Engineering Regiment, in Chatham
 2 Training Regiment, Army Air Corps, at AAC Middle Wallop
 3 Royal School of Military Engineering Regiment, in Minley Manor
 14 Regiment, Royal Artillery, in Larkhill
 25 Training Regiment, Royal Logistic Corps, in Leconfield
 Experimentation and Trials Group
 Infantry Trials and Development Unit (ITDU)
 Armoured Trials and Development Unit (ATDU)
 Royal Artillery Trials and Development Unit (RA TDU)
 Royal Engineers Trials and Development Unit (RE TDU)
 Combat Service Support Training and Development Unit (CSS TDU)
 2nd Battalion, Yorkshire Regiment, in Catterick

Home Command 
 Home Command, in Aldershot
 Army Personnel Centre (APC), in Glasgow
 Army Personnel Services Group (APSG)
 Arms and Services

Army Recruiting and Initial Training Command 
 Army Recruiting and Initial Training Command (ARITC), in Upavon
 Army Officer Selection Board (AOSB), in Westbury (Officer Selection)
 Recruiting Group (RG), in Upavon (Recruit enlistment)
 School of Infantry (SCHINF), in Catterick (Infantry training)
 Initial Training Group (ITG), in Pirbright and Grantham (Basic training)
 Army Adventurous Training Group (Army) (ATG(A), in Upavon (Adventurous training)

Royal Military Academy Sandhurst Group 
 Royal Military Academy Sandhurst Group, in Sandhurst
 Royal Military Academy Sandhurst (RMAS)
 University Officer Training Corps (UOTC)
 General Staff Centre (GSC)
 Centre for Army Leadership (CAL)

London District 
 London District (LONDIST), in Westminster
 Household Cavalry Mounted Regiment, at Hyde Park Barracks in Knightsbridge (Public Duties and State Ceremonial)
 King's Troop, Royal Horse Artillery, at Royal Artillery Barracks in Woolwich (Public Duties and State Ceremonial)
 1st Battalion, Welsh Guards, in Windsor (Light Infantry)
 London Regiment, in Battersea (Infantry - Reserve; will be retitled 1st Battalion, London Guards by 2024)
 Public Duties Teams, at Wellington Barracks in London (Public Duties and State Ceremonial; to be established by August 2022)
 Nijmegen Company, Grenadier Guards
 No. 7 Company, Coldstream Guards
 F Company, Scots Guards
 Household Division Bands
 Mounted Band of the Household Cavalry
 Band of the Grenadier Guards
 Band of the Coldstream Guards
 Band of the Scots Guards
 Band of the Irish Guards
 Band of the Welsh Guards
 Countess of Wessex's String Orchestra
 Regional Bands
 Band of the Royal Regiment of Scotland
 Band and Bugles of The Rifles
 Band of the Brigade of Gurkhas
 Prince of Wales Band
 Catterick Band
 Tidworth Band
 Sandhurst Band

Regional Command 
 Regional Command (RC), in Aldershot
 Regional Point of Command South East, in Aldershot
 Regional Point of Command South West, in Tidworth
 Regional Point of Command North (Its exact location remains subject to further work.)
 Regional Point of Command Centre, in Cottesmore
 38 (Irish) Brigade, in Lisburn
 51st Infantry Brigade and Headquarters Scotland, in Edinburgh
 Balaklava Company, 5th Battalion, The Royal Regiment of Scotland, in Edinburgh
 160th (Welsh) Brigade, in Brecon

Joint Helicopter Command 
 Joint Helicopter Command, in Andover
 Army Aviation Centre, at AAC Middle Wallop
 Watchkeeper Force HQ, at AAC Middle Wallop

1st Aviation Brigade Combat Team 
 1st Aviation Brigade Combat Team, at AAC Middle Wallop
 1 Regiment, Army Air Corps, at RNAS Yeovilton (Aviation Reconnaissance)
 3 Regiment, Army Air Corps, at Wattisham Flying Station (Attack Aviation)
 4 Regiment, Army Air Corps, at Wattisham Flying Station (Attack Aviation)
 5 Regiment, Army Air Corps, at Aldergrove Flying Station (Aviation Reconnaissance)
 6 Regiment, Army Air Corps, in Bury St Edmunds (Aviation Support Regiment - Reserve)
 7 AS Battalion, Royal Electrical and Mechanical Engineers, at Wattisham Flying Station (Aviation Close Support)

 Provost Marshal (Army) 
Provost Marshal (Army) polices the army and undertakes activities concerned with investigations, custodial matters and security in the UK. The 1st Royal Military Police Group provides police support to the force at an operational level, which includes operational detention, and support to security and stability policing.
 Provost Marshal (Army), in Andover

 1st Royal Military Police Group 
 1st Royal Military Police Group, in Andover
 1 Regiment, Royal Military Police, in Catterick (Military Police, hybrid active/reserve unit)
 3 Regiment, Royal Military Police, in Bulford (Military Police, hybrid active/reserve unit)
 Special Investigation Branch, in Bulford (Special Investigations Branch)
 Special Operations Unit, in Southwick Park (Specialist Operations)
 Military Provost Staff Corps, in Colchester (Military Police)

 Army units in other parts of Defence 
Army units assigned to other parts of Defence:

 Navy Command 
 3 Commando Brigade, in Plymouth
 29 Commando Regiment, Royal Artillery, in Plymouth (Commando Artillery)
 24 Commando Regiment, Royal Engineers, in Chivenor (Commando Engineers)

 Air Command 
 No. 22 Group, at RAF High Wycombe
 11 Signal Regiment, Royal Corps of Signals, in Blandford (Defence School of Communications and Information Systems)
 8 Training Battalion, Royal Electrical and Mechanical Engineers, in Lyneham (REME Training Battalion)

 UK Strategic Command 
 Defence Intelligence, in London
 42 Engineer Regiment (Geographic), Royal Engineers, at RAF Wyton (Geographical Support)
 Director Overseas Basing, in London
 Royal Gibraltar Regiment, in Gibraltar (Light Infantry)

 Graphic overview 

Unit changes
The following are the units that will be raised, disbanded, amalgamated, re-designated, and re-roled under the reforms:

Units raised
 No 9 Company, Irish Guards
 No 12 Company, Irish Guards
 9 Equipment Support Battalion, Royal Electrical and Mechanical Engineers

Disbandment
 3 Medical Regiment
 3 Regiment, Royal Logistic Corps

AmalgamationsInfantry 1st and 2nd Battalions of the Mercian Regiment, as the 1st Battalion.Royal Army Medical Corps 207 (Manchester) Field Hospital and 208 (Liverpool) Field Hospital to form 206 (North West) Multi-Role Medical Regiment.
 204 (North Irish) Field Hospital and 253 (North Irish) Medical Regiment to form 210 (North Irish) Multi-Role Medical Regiment.
 201 (Northern) Field Hospital and 212 (Yorkshire) Field Hospital to form 214 (North East) Multi-Role Medical Regiment.
 205 (Scottish) Field Hospital and 225 (Scottish) Medical Regiment to form 215 (Scottish) Multi-Role Medical Regiment.

Re-designationsInfantry London Regiment to become the London Guards.
 Royal Scots Borderers, 1st Battalion, Royal Regiment of Scotland to become 1st Battalion, Ranger Regiment.
 2nd Battalion, Princess of Wales's Royal Regiment to become 2nd Battalion, Ranger Regiment.
 2nd Battalion, Duke of Lancaster's Regiment to become 3rd Battalion, Ranger Regiment.
 4th Battalion, The Rifles to become 4th Battalion, Ranger Regiment.
 3rd Battalion, Royal Gurkha Rifles not formed, with personnel instead forming reinforcement companies for Ranger RegimentRoyal Army Medical Corps 22 Field Hospital to become 22 Multi-Role Medical Regiment.
 34 Field Hospital to become 21 Multi-Role Medical Regiment.
 202 (Midlands) Field Hospital to become 202 (Midlands) Multi-Role Medical Regiment.
 203 (Welsh) Field Hospital to become 203 (Welsh) Multi-Role Medical Regiment.
 243 (The Wessex) Field Hospital to become 243 (Wessex) Multi-Role Medical Regiment.
 254 (East of England) Medical Regiment to become 254 (East of England) Multi-Role Medical Regiment.
 256 (City of London) Field Hospital to become 256 (London and South East) Multi-Role Medical Regiment.

Re-roleInfantry 1st Battalion, Irish Guards from Light role infantry to Security force assistance.
 1st Battalion, Royal Anglian Regiment from Light role infantry to Security force assistance.
 3rd Battalion, The Rifles from Light mechanised infantry to Security force assistance.
 Black Watch, 3rd Battalion, Royal Regiment of Scotland from Light mechanised infantry to Security force assistance.
 1st Battalion, Welsh Guards from Light mechanised infantry to Light role infantry.
 1st Battalion, The Rifles from Light role infantry to Light mechanished infantry
 2nd Battalion, Royal Anglian Regiment from Light role infantry to Light mechanished infantry
 1st Battalion, Yorkshire Regiment from Armoured infantry to Light mechanised infantry.
 The Highlanders, 4th Battalion, Royal Regiment of Scotland from Armoured infantry to Light mechanised infantry.
 1st Battalion, Princess of Wales's Royal Regiment from Light role infantry to Mechanised infantry.Royal Armoured Corps'''
 King's Royal Hussars from Armoured to Armoured cavalry.

Notes

References 
 

F